Buchanan Pass, elevation , is a mountain pass located in the Rocky Mountains of north-central Colorado in the United States. The pass is toward the northern end of the Indian Peaks of the Front Range on the Grand-Boulder county line, between the Buchanan Creek drainage to the west and the Middle St. Vrain Creek drainage to the east. It is traversed by the Buchanan Pass Trail which travels from its junction with the Cascade Creek Trail on the west to the Camp Dick campground on the east, close to Peaceful Valley. The pass is in the Indian Peaks Wilderness of the Arapaho and Roosevelt National Forests and is the easternmost mountain pass on the continental divide.

References

Mountain passes of Colorado
Landforms of Boulder County, Colorado
Landforms of Grand County, Colorado
Great Divide of North America